Erich Franz (5 November 1903 – 10 February 1961) was a German actor. He appeared in more than thirty films from 1953 to 1972.

Selected filmography

References

External links 

1903 births
1961 deaths
German male film actors